Ralph Hewins (1909 – 1984) was a British biographer. Amongst his most famous works are Count Folke Bernadotte: his Life and Work (1949), The Richest American: J. Paul Getty (1960) and the Vidkun Quisling biography Quisling: Prophet without Honour (1965), which was translated into Norwegian (titled Quisling: profet uten ære). The biography of Quisling stirred much controversy in Norway, owing to its apologetic and revisionist portrayal of the Nazi collaborationist Quisling.

References

1909 births
1984 deaths
British biographers
20th-century biographers